The Pragian is one of three faunal stages in the Early Devonian Epoch. It lasted from 410.8 ± 2.8 million years ago to 407.6 ± 2.8 million years ago. It was preceded by the Lochkovian Stage and followed by the Emsian Stage. The most important Lagerstätte of the Pragian is Rhynie chert in Scotland. It is named after the city of Prague. The GSSP is located within the Prague Formation at Velká Chuchle, Prague.

In North America the Pragian Stage is represented by Siegenian or Deerparkian time.

Pragian life 

The first ammonoids (order Agoniatitida) appeared in later parts of this stage (at the lower boundary of the Zlichovian stage as it was known in Siberian representations). They were descended from bactritoid nautiloid ancestors, which also appeared in this stage before experiencing evolutionary radiations in the next stage.

References 

 
Early Devonian